The Lanckoroński Foundation is a Switzerland-based charitable organisation with offices in Vienna and London providing assistance to Polish causes, mainly in the cultural sphere.

The Foundation offers three scholarships to Polish students admitted to the Bruges campus of the College of Europe. Scholarships are granted after the selection interviews with the Polish selection committee.

The Foundation was established in 1967 by the late Countess Karolina Lanckorońska, a World War II resistance fighter and concentration camp survivor from an ancient, noble, ethnic Polish family.

The current (as of 2006) President of the Board of the 
Lanckoroński Foundation is Zygmunt Jan Ansgary Tyszkiewicz (CMG) of Cambridge, England.

References

Organizations established in 1967
Educational charities
International charities
Charities based in Switzerland
Foreign charities operating in Poland